Tigan Island is the partly ice-free island 750 m long in west–east direction and 226 m wide in the Dannebrog Islands group of Wilhelm Archipelago in the Antarctic Peninsula region. Its surface area is 10.68 ha.

The feature is so named because of its shape supposedly resembling a frying pan ('tigan' in Bulgarian), and in association with other descriptive names of islands in the area.

Location
It abuts Pegas Island on the south, and is situated 115 m south of Yastreb Island and 3 km northwest of Revolver Island. British mapping in 2001.

Maps
 British Admiralty Nautical Chart 446 Anvers Island to Renaud Island. Scale 1:150000. Admiralty, UK Hydrographic Office, 2001
 Brabant Island to Argentine Islands. Scale 1:250000 topographic map. British Antarctic Survey, 2008
 Antarctic Digital Database (ADD). Scale 1:250000 topographic map of Antarctica. Scientific Committee on Antarctic Research (SCAR). Since 1993, regularly upgraded and updated

See also
 List of Antarctic and subantarctic islands

Notes

References
 Tigan Island. SCAR Composite Gazetteer of Antarctica
 Bulgarian Antarctic Gazetteer. Antarctic Place-names Commission. (details in Bulgarian, basic data in English)

External links
 Tigan Island. Adjusted Copernix satellite image

Islands of the Wilhelm Archipelago
Bulgaria and the Antarctic